Theodore "Dash" Hardeen (born Ferenc Dezső Weisz; March 4, 1876 – June 12, 1945) was a Hungarian-American magician and escape artist who was the younger brother of Harry Houdini. Hardeen, who usually billed himself as the "brother of Houdini", was the founder of the Magician's Guild. Hardeen was the first magician to conceive escaping from a straitjacket in full view of the audience, rather than behind a curtain.

Early life
Hardeen was born as "Ferenc Dezső Weisz" (or "Ferencz Dezső Weisz") in Budapest, Austria-Hungary, and went by the name "Theodore Weiss" when he and his family were living in Appleton, Wisconsin. He was known as "Deshi" and later "Dash" by his parents.

In 1893, Hardeen performed with Houdini at Coney Island as "The Brothers Houdini". While he and Harry were there, Harry met and married Wilhelmina Beatrice "Bess" Rahner.

Magical career

Will Goldston, English stage magician and editor of the Magician Annual, wrote that:

After his brother's death in 1926, Hardeen played the vaudeville circuit, doing many of his late brother's routines. From 1938 to 1941, he was featured in Olsen and Johnson's Broadway revue, Hellzapoppin. During World War II, he performed for the troops (as his brother had done during World War I).

In 1936, Hardeen starred in a Vitaphone short film for Warner Bros. called Medium Well Done. In it, Hardeen played a "hardboiled detective" on the case of a bogus medium. The film was directed by Lloyd French, who directed many of the early Laurel and Hardy shorts.

Like his brother, Hardeen was skeptical of the claims of spiritualist mediums. With his friend Julien Proskauer he exposed the fraudulent methods of mediums.

Houdini, in his will, requested that all his files be given to Hardeen and destroyed ("I give, devise and bequeath to my brother, Theodore, Professionally known as "Hardeen" all my theatrical effects, new mysteries and illusions and accompanying paraphernalia, to be burnt and destroyed upon his death.") On August 15, 1927 Hardeen's Brooklyn home was broken into and some of Houdini's apparatus were damaged. Later that year, Hardeen burned all of Houdini's personal files in a furnace in his basement.

Planning on writing a book about his brother, in 1945 Hardeen went to Manhattan's Doctors Hospital for a simple operation.  He unexpectedly died of complications while recovering from the procedure. He was 69 years old.

Legacy

During his final show on May 29, 1945 in Ridgeway, Queens, Hardeen named his chief assistant, Douglas Geoffrey, his official successor. Geoffrey then went on to perform as "Hardeen, Jr."; he died January 14, 1990, at the age of 82.

Richard Valentine Pitchford (1895–1973) took over the Magicians' Guild after Hardeen's death. Sidney Hollis Radner received the Houdini collection from Hardeen.

Gallery

References

Further reading
 Goldston, Will. The Magician Annual (1911–1912)
 Hardeen, Theodore. (1903). Life and History of Hardeen. New York.

External links

Theodore Hareen is interviewed over WNYC in 1939

1876 births
1945 deaths
American magicians
American people of Hungarian-Jewish descent
American performance artists
American skeptics
Austro-Hungarian emigrants to the United States
Austro-Hungarian Jews
Escapologists
Harry Houdini
Hungarian Jews
Hungarian magicians
Musicians from Budapest
People from Appleton, Wisconsin
Vaudeville performers
Critics of Spiritualism